LaTocha Reney Scott (born October 2, 1973) is an American R&B singer, songwriter, and occasional actress. She is best known as a member of the multi-platinum selling R&B group Xscape, who rose to popularity in the 1990s.

Biography 
Scott was born in Atlanta, Georgia to her father, Rev. Randolf Scott and her mother, Gloria McFarlin who worked as a teacher at school. At the age of 6, she began to sing in church, weddings, and local talent shows. At 11, she had recorded her first song with her sister Tamika. Scott attended TriCities High School of Performing Arts in Atlanta, Georgia, transferring to Tri-Cities High School in East Point, Georgia graduating in 1991.

Her sister is Tamika Scott.

In 1995, she married music manager Rocky Bivens. Their son Jamon was born in August 1997.

Scott eats plant based. She released cookbook LaTocha Planted Lifestyle.

Career

1991-1992: Xscape beginnings 
Prior to joining R&B group Xscape, Scott had been performing with a group called Precise. While attending Tri-Cities performing arts high school in East Point, Georgia, Scott's sister Tamika met Kandi Burruss. The three began singing together and recruited a fourth member, Tamera Coggins, though her time with the group was short-lived. Soon Tameka "Tiny" Cottle was asked to audition for the girls, and Xscape was officially formed. After the group's major debut performance at BET's Teen Summit in 1992, the girls were introduced to record executive Ian Burke, who later became the group's manager. Xscape soon caught the attention of Jermaine Dupri, who later signed the group to his So So Def Recordings.

1993-1999: R&B success 
The group released their debut album, Hummin' Comin' at 'Cha on October 12, 1993. The album peaked at number seventeen on the U.S. Billboard 200 and number three on the Top R&B Albums chart. It was a critical and commercial success, certified platinum within a year, and launched two hit singles. The two lead singles, "Just Kickin' It" and "Understanding", both entered the top 10 on the Billboard Hot 100 and peaked at number one on the Hot R&B/Hip-Hop Songs chart. The follow-up singles, "Love on My Mind" and "Tonight", did not achieve the same success. The group later appeared on The Mask soundtrack and the soundtrack for the 1995 film Panther, featuring the single "Freedom", a female group that featured her younger sister Tamika.

Xscape released their second studio album, Off the Hook, in 1995. Much of the album's production was by Jermaine Dupri and featured guest vocals from MC Lyte. Four singles were released. "Feel So Good" and "Who Can I Run To" peaked at #32 and #8 on the Billboard Hot 100 chart respectively. The latter release, "Can't Hang/Do You Want To", was a joint single and reached the top ten of the Billboard R&B charts. "Off the Hook" was certified platinum in 1995. In 1996, the group was featured on MC Lyte's single "Keep On, Keepin' On", which appeared on the Sunset Park soundtrack. The single reached the top 10 on the Billboard Hot 100 chart. In 1997, as the group's popularity grew, they appeared on the soundtracks of the films Love Jones and Soul Food.

In 1997, the group found new management and released their third studio album, Traces of My Lipstick in 1998. The album entered the Billboard 200 at number 28, and featured top 10 hits "The Arms of the One Who Loves You" and "My Little Secret", which Scott co-wrote with Jermaine Dupri, earning the pair an ASCAP Rhythm and Soul Music Award. In early 1998, Xscape was featured on the Keith Sweat-produced single, "Am I Dreamin'", by R&B newcomer group Ol' Skool only Scott, Cottle and Burruss appeared on this track (excluding her sister Tamika, who appears and in the music video).

1999-2005: Xscape disbandment 
The dynamic of the group had changed by the third album, which led to Scott leaving the group in 1999 to pursue a solo career. Subsequently, the group went on hiatus. An attempt at a fourth album was made in 2004 but the project was scrapped due to a lack of promotion.

2001-2005: Solo career 
Emerging as a solo artist, Scott appeared solo on NFL Jamz in 1998 with a song entitled "Promises". She later released the single "Liar Liar", which appeared on The Best Man soundtrack in 1999.

By the early 2000s, Scott had ventured more into performing as a solo artist.  She soon reconnected with ex-manager Michael Mauldin and signed a recording contract with Sony Urban. Scott's debut solo album with Sony was never released, due to label issues, forcing her to leave the label in 2001. Shortly after, Scott collaborated with rapper Trick Daddy on the song "Thug Holiday" in 2002. Without major label distribution, Scott eventually completed her debut album, Solo Flight 404, featuring the single "Still Ghetto".

In 2004, Scott, along with Tamika Scott, Tameka "Tiny" Cottle, and new member Kiesha Miles, attempted to revamp Xscape. They released the single "What's Up" in 2005, but the reconciliation was short-lived and the group ultimately disbanded in 2005.

Around the same time, Scott made her first film appearance in the 2005 comedy, Fair Game.

2012-present 
LaTocha Scott released a new single entitled "Bad Timing" from her studio album, released in 2012.

She starred in the second season of the TV One show R&B Divas: Atlanta in 2013.

In 2017, Scott re-joined band members Tamika Scott, Kandi Burruss, and Tameka "Tiny" Harris to continue touring as Xscape. After the initial tour, Burruss declined to further participate so the ladies are now a trio touring as 'Xscap3'.

Discography 

 Solo Flight 404 (2004)
 The Invitation: A Conversation with God (2023)

Filmography

References

External links 

1973 births
Living people
Musicians from Atlanta
American rhythm and blues singer-songwriters
American women singer-songwriters
African-American actresses
20th-century African-American women singers
African-American women singer-songwriters
21st-century American women singers
21st-century American singers
21st-century African-American women singers
Singer-songwriters from Georgia (U.S. state)